Barview is an unincorporated community in Tillamook County, Oregon, United States, named in 1884 by L. C. Smith for its exceptional view of the bar at the entrance to Tillamook Bay.

Geography 
Barview is near two other unincorporated communities in Tillamook County, Twin Rocks and Watseco. The three communities are along the  stretch of U.S. Route 101 between the cities of Rockaway Beach and Garibaldi.

Life saving station
The Tillamook Life Saving Station, designed by Victor Mindeleff and built in 1908, is in Barview. It was part of the United States Life-Saving Service, which provided aid to mariners in distress. The property, transferred to private ownership during World War II, is the only remaining such station in Oregon.

The building and adjacent boathouse are vacant and neglected, and have sustained damage through a car crash and a leaking sewer main. With the future of the building in flux, it was listed as one of the Historic Preservation League of Oregon's Most Endangered Places in Oregon 2011.

References 

Unincorporated communities in Tillamook County, Oregon
Unincorporated communities in Oregon